Ikniouen is a commune in the tinghir Province of the Drâa tafilalte administrative region of Morocco. At the time of the 2004 census, the commune had a total population of 15738 people living in 1645 households.

References

Populated places in Ouarzazate Province
Rural communes of Drâa-Tafilalet